Everything to Everyone (commonly abbreviated E2E) is the sixth full-length studio album by Barenaked Ladies. It was released in 2003 and was produced by Ron Aniello. Singles from the album include "Another Postcard", "Testing 1, 2, 3", "For You", "Celebrity" and "Maybe Katie". The content of the album is noted for its increased political commentary over previous albums. This was their last album with Reprise Records (or any major label for that matter) before switching to a more independent label, Desperation Records and subsequently Raisin' Records.

Creative process
After recording and touring incessantly from 1995 until 2001, the quintet opted to take some time off for 2002 and most of 2003. It was the first long-term hiatus for the band since their inception. Upon returning to the recording studio to begin recording what would become Everything to Everyone, BNL adopted a new policy of keeping the writing exclusively within the band members. This resulted in increased contribution from Jim Creeggan and Kevin Hearn, and the band ended up recording more songs than usual (which in turn resulted in a 14-song album plus a bonus track). The album was recorded in Los Angeles, and was the first album the band recorded following the inception of their online blog. This allowed the band to communicate with their fans on a continual basis during the recording, and gave additional insight into the creative process.

The band took to the facility's B-studio near the end of the recording to record versions of the album's songs on acoustic instruments. This was quickly set up, and drummer Tyler Stewart ended up using a drum kit assembled from various unusual objects. The band performed eleven songs which comprised the entire released album except for "Shopping", "Unfinished", "War on Drugs" and the bonus track "Yes! Yes!! Yes!!!". This acoustic session proved successful, and a similar performance would be undertaken for their next album, Barenaked Ladies Are Me (abbreviated as BLAM).

The album's cover was painted by Canadian Chris Woods, and depicts the band in profile displaying a white flag of surrender. The title text was displayed over the flag, though to preserve the meaning of the white flag, the album title was not printed on the cover itself. It was instead placed as a sticker on the transparent wrapping, and was "flat", not wavy to match the flag's contours. For the special edition, the title was on the clear plastic sleeve, and matched the flag's waves. The original painting, a 60" x 60" oil on canvas, reportedly hangs at Page's farmhouse studio, Fresh Baked Woods.

Tracks recorded but not included on the album: 
 "Statue of Los Angeles" (unreleased) – a Hearn song; released on his album The Miracle Mile
 "Sign Me Up" (unreleased) – described as "basically us swearing our heads off for six minutes"
 "Adrift" (re-recorded for BLAM, and released on the album Stop Us If You've Heard This One Before)
 "What a Let Down" (re-recorded for BLAM)
 "I Can, I Will, I Do" (previously recorded on Disc One, and re-recorded for BLAM; appears on iTunes Originals - Barenaked Ladies. Later released on Stop Us If You've Heard This One Before).
 "Yes! Yes!! Yes!!!" (bonus track on the special edition's DVD, and b-side on the UK single for "Celebrity". Later released on Stop Us If You've Heard This One Before).

As with each of their early albums, the band recorded one song, "Sign Me Up", completely naked. Everything to Everyone is the band’s last album for which a naked track (recorded in the nude) was recorded.

Release
The album was released in three versions:
The standard 14-track album
A limited edition, marked with a sticker, that contained three bonus tracks from the acoustic session
A special edition in a threefold digipack with plastic sleeve; with the standard CD, and a bonus DVD labeled Everything Else (containing DVD-Audio of the album including bonus track "Yes! Yes!! Yes!!!", and both video and stereo-audio forms of the acoustic show, and several video clips from the recording studio)

The album's first single was "Another Postcard", which many fans perceived as an attempt by the record company to repeat the success of hit singles "One Week" from Stunt and "Pinch Me" from Maroon, which have similar styles and rap-based vocals. Though the band appeared on a number of major U.S. talk shows to promote it, the single was not significantly successful. The band supported the album release with a U.S. tour called the Peepshow tour, which was not a typical promotional tour for the band and was seen as being somewhat geared towards the band's biggest fans, rather than promoting the album to casual fans. Everything to Everyone debuted in the Canadian and US Top 10, but dropped fairly quickly down the charts. At the time it was only the band's second album to have not at least been certified Gold in the US, along with 1994's Maybe You Should Drive.

The album's second single, "Testing 1,2,3", was released early in 2004 with its own music video, coinciding with a more traditional arena tour. A different single, "Maybe Katie", was released to radio in Canada. The album, however, did not see a significant resurgence in sales.

A third single, "For You", was released on a single with the album version and a live version from Glasgow, Scotland, but did not receive a video. The song received little airplay. In the UK, "Celebrity" was released as a radio and commercial single.

DualDisc version 
Everything to Everyone was included among a group of 15 DualDisc releases that were test marketed in Boston and Seattle. It contains the standard CD album on one side, and bonus DVD material on the second side. The DualDisc version has not been reissued.

Track listing

Personnel

Barenaked Ladies
Jim Creeggan – double bass, electric bass, vocals, 
Kevin Hearn – organ, acoustic guitar, mandolin, piano, accordion, electric guitar, keyboards, vocals, saw, vibraphone
Steven Page – acoustic guitar, electric guitar, vocals
Ed Robertson – acoustic guitar, electric guitar, vocals
Tyler Stewart – drums, percussion, vocals

Additional personnel
Ron Aniello – banjo, percussion, electric guitar
Charlie Bisharat – violin
Blue Man Group (Chris Bowen, Matt Goldman, Brian Scott, Phil Stanton, Chris Wink) – percussion
Larry Corbett – cello
Joel Derouin – violin
Yvonne Gallegos – vocals
Annabelle Hill – vocals
Chris Wonzer – vocals
Roberto "Tiny" Menegoni – percussion

Production
Producer: Ron Aniello
Engineers: Tim Oberthier, Clint Roth, Eric Sarafin, Ed Thacker
Assistant engineers: Daniel Kresco, Brian Wohlgemuth, Chris Wonzer
Mixing: Mike Shipley
Mastering: Bob Ludwig
Digital Editing: Clint Roth
A&R: Jeffrey Aldrich
String arrangements: Jim Creeggan
String contractor: Suzie Katayama
Design: Stephen Walker
Collage: Phil Mucci
Photography: Phil Mucci
Cover painting: Chris Woods
Office coordinator: Jonathan Abrams

References

External links
 

Barenaked Ladies albums
2003 albums
Reprise Records albums